Limbang is a border town and the capital of Limbang District in the Limbang Division of northern Sarawak, East Malaysia, on the island of Borneo. This district area is 3,978.10 square kilometres, and population (year 2020 census) was 56,900. It is located on the banks of the Limbang River (Sungai Limbang in Malay), between the two halves of Brunei.

Etymology
A settlement along the Limbang River was previously known as "Pangkalan Tarap" where trade activities thrived. The name was derived from a well-known fruit in the Malay community. However, when the settlement was combined with Trusan district and Lawas district, "Pangkalan Tarap" changed its name to "Limbang", naming it after the river on which it is situated.

History

In 1884, there was a rebellion by Limbang residents protesting against the high tax rate imposed by the Bruneian Empire. William Hood Treacher, who held the dual position as the governor of North Borneo and British Royal Consul at Labuan, saw an opportunity to acquire more territories from the Bruneian empire. Treacher offered himself to mediate the taxation dispute between the local chiefs and the Bruneian empire. He sailed to Brunei on H.M.S Pegasus, backed by British navy. Treacher successfully arranged for peace in the Limbang region after Temenggong Hashim agreed not to impose any more arbitrary taxes. After the event, Treacher leased Padas River, Klias Peninsula, Bongawan, and Tawaran (now Tuaran) from the sultan of Brunei for $ 3000 payment per year.

The Brooke government, threatened by Treacher's expansionist policy into northern Sarawak, sent F.O. Maxwell, a Resident of the First Division of Sarawak (today Kuching Division) to Brunei, demanding compensation for the killings of Sarawak subjects in Trusan area (near Lawas). Trusan area at that time was still under the control of the Brunei government. Maxwell also threatened to stop the cession money payment if he did not receive any compensation. Under pressure from Maxwell, Temenggong Hashim agreed to cede the Trusan area to Sarawak. However, the Sultan of Brunei (Sultan Mumin) did not consent to the cession of land. Both Charles Brooke and Temenggong maintained that Sultan's stamp was not required for the cession. Charles later occupied the Trusan area by force. On 29 May 1885, Sultan Mumin died and Temenggong Hashim ascended to the Brunei throne to become Sultan Hashim.

In 1886, Leys (former consul of Brunei) and Charles Brooke tried to persuade Sultan Hashim to cede Limbang but to no avail. Sultan Hashim's decision was in line with his pangerans (princes) that further cession of Bruneian territory will leave Sultan's authority in the name only. Besides, Sultan Hashim did not wish to see his sultanate vanishing under his rule. Sir Frederick Weld, former governor of the Straits Settlement from 1880 to 1887, went to Labuan in May 1887. Weld then consulted the chiefs of the Limbang river. They firmly rejected Sultan's rule and were willing to accept a white man's rule. Weld tried to push an ultimatum that the Sultan either agreed on the cession of Limbang or to accept a resident. Sultan Hashim hestitated.  Crocker, the acting governor of North Borneo, advised the Sultan that if he did not accept a resident in Limbang, James Brooke will be permitted to seizure Limbang without any compensation to the Sultan. Sultan Hashim decided to accept a resident after Crocker's advice.

On 17 September 1888, Brunei signed an agreement with Great Britain which formally put Brunei under British protectorate, hoping to stem further losses of territories to the Brooke government or NBCC. However, on 17 March 1890, Rajah Charles Brooke announced that Limbang was to be part of the Kingdom of Sarawak. Brunei tried to seek help from Britain regarding the loss of the Limbang territory but to no avail. To this date, Brunei still claims Limbang as hers as it was forcibly and illegally taken.

Between 1899 and 1901, another rebellion occurred in Tutong District and Belait District. Sultan Hashim was again pressured to cede both the districts, but he firmly refused, as loss of both districts would make Brunei non-existent on the map of Borneo, resembling "a tree without branches".

During the Brunei Revolt in 1962, Limbang was occupied by the North Borneo Liberation Army (Tentera Nasional Kalimantan Utara, TNKU). TNKU killed four members of the police and eleven European civilians including the Limbang district officer and his wife. Within five days, British and Australian forces from Singapore contained the rebellion.

Government
Limbang is part of the Limbang District, which is part of the Limbang Division, which is part of Sarawak, Malaysia.

Climate
Limbang features an equatorial climate that is a tropical rainforest climate more subject to the Intertropical Convergence Zone than the trade winds and with no or rare cyclones. The climate is warm and wet. The city sees heavy precipitation throughout the course of the year. The Northeast Monsoon blows from December to March, while the Southeast Monsoon dominates from around June to October.

Demographics

 Bisaya
 Lun Bawang
 Iban
 Malay
 Orang Ulu
 Kedayan
 Chinese

Economy
Before the late 19th century, Limbang was the "rice bowl" for Brunei, producing cheap agricultural produce for Bruneian Empire. Northern Region Development Agency (NRDA) was established on 15 March 2018.  NRDA has been tasked to develop aquaculture, livestock, oil and gas as well as logistics industries in Limbang and Lawas districts to reap economic benefits from Brunei Darussalam–Indonesia–Malaysia–Philippines East ASEAN Growth Area (BIMP-EAGA).

Transport

Air
Limbang is served by Limbang Airport, which also serves the whole of Limbang District.

Road
Owing to its geographical location, Limbang is completely cut off from the rest of Sarawak's road network. However, it has good road links to both parts of Brunei, located to the east and west of the district. There is also a good local network of roads within the district. As the only road connection to outside the district is through Brunei, one must have a passport to travel into or out of Limbang.

There are two Immigration, Customs and Quarantine Complexes in Limbang district, both into Brunei.

Tedungan: This checkpoint corresponds to Brunei checkpoint is called Kuala Lurah. It is located 43 km west of Limbang. It is the road crossing into the main part of Brunei from Limbang. 

Pandaruan: This checkpoint enters Kampung Ujong Jalan, Temburong district, Brunei over the Pandaruan River, located at 15 km east of Limbang. Previously, the crossing was only possible by using ferry services. Pandaruan Bridge was built on 8 December 2013 to facilitate river crossings.

Other utilities

Education
SJK (C) Chung Hwa Limbang
 SK Limbang
 SK Melayu Pusat
 SK Kampung Pahlawan
 SK St. Edmund
 SK Menuang
 SK Batu Danau
 SK Pengkalan Jawa
 SK Tedungan
 SK Bukit Luba
 SK Tanjong
 SK Meritam
 SK Ukong
 SK Nanga Medamit
 SK Long Napir
 SK Kuala Mendalam
 SK Nanga Merit
 SK Kubong
 SK RC Kubong
 SK Gadong
SMK Seri Patiambun Limbang
SMK Medamit
SMK Limbang
SMK Kubong
SMK(A) Limbang

Healthcare
The old Limbang Hospital is located in Limbang which is now used as a Laboratory of Drugs and Drug Stores. It was established on 18 August 1961 with 16 nurses and 10 attendants with 54 beds.

In line with the increase in population and the development of Limbang Town, the new Limbang Hospital was officially opened on June 29, 1980, by the then-President of the State of Sarawak Tun Datuk Patinggi Abang Hj MuhammadSalahuddin. The construction cost RM 4.912 million with an area of 7.8 hectares.

As of 2017, a staff strength of 279 people including 19 Medical Officers and 1 Gynecologist and 2 Radiologists.

Culture and leisure

Limbang Regional Museum

The Limbang Regional Museum is located in a fort built by Rajah Charles Brooke in 1897. It is located in the area annexed to Sarawak by the White Rajah in 1890.

Taman Tasik Bukit Mas
Taman Tasik Bukit Mas (literal translation: Gold Hill Lake Park) is a recreational park set in Limbang's iconic feature, Bukit Mas. Limbang residents do their recreational activities in the park in the evening. A children's playground, lake, barbecue site, suspension bridge and toilet are provided.

Limbang Plaza
Limbang Plaza is located in the town centre, and is often dubbed the definite centre of Limbang. This building mainly consists of three components: Purnama Hotel, a shopping mall and various government offices (located atop the mall). It's also used for other businesses and activities.

Currently the mall has about 50 shopping outlets, with a local supermarket chain, Queen, as the main tenant.

Pasar Tamu
"Pasar Tamu" is a local gathering where villagers come to the town of Limbang to sell their goods. Usually it is held every Friday, but preparations begin on Thursday.

The market has attracted not only local residents, but also Bruneians.

Notable people
Abang Abdul Rahman Zohari Abang Openg - The current Chief Minister of Sarawak.
James Wong (politician) - the former Deputy Chief Minister of Sarawak.
GT Lim - Malaysian pastor, singer and actor.

References

External links

Limbang District
Towns in Sarawak
Brunei–Malaysia border crossings